The Bajwat Wildlife Sanctuary in Pakistan protects a complex of natural riverine habitats along the Chenab River and two of its tributaries, extending up to the border with India.  Its total area of  provides protection for waterfowl, as well as a variety of mammals including hog deer and nilgai.   Scientists have recorded 110 species of birds on the site.   The most common are species of the family Motacillidae.  The sanctuary is in the Sialkot District.

References

Wildlife sanctuaries in Punjab, Pakistan
Wildlife sanctuaries of Pakistan
Tourist attractions in Sialkot
Protected areas of Punjab, Pakistan